The  Colombia lunar sample displays  are two commemorative plaques consisting of small fragments of Moon specimen brought back with the Apollo 11 and Apollo 17 lunar missions and given in the 1970s to the people of Colombia by United States President Richard Nixon as goodwill gifts.

Description

Apollo 11

Apollo 17

History

Misael Pastrana Borrero kept both displays in his personal possession. In 1985, it was revealed they were not a personal gift, and Juan Carlos Pastrana, son of Misael Pastrana Borrero, gave them to the Bogotá Planetarium. Since their return to public hands, the lunar sample displays have remained in secured storage within the Planetarium of Bogotá until 2003 when they were displayed for the first time to the public as part of the planetarium's permanent collection.

External links
 Collect Space - Moonrock list

References

Colombia–United States relations
Science and technology in Colombia
Space program of Colombia